The Staurotypinae are a subfamily of the family Kinosternidae of aquatic turtles, which contains the genera Claudius and Staurotypus.

Staurotypus exhibits XX/XY sex determination, in contrast to the temperature-dependent sex determination of most turtles. Although the exact mechanism of sex determination in Claudius is unknown, it is known to be genetically determined; it is suspected that it exhibits XX/XY sex determination as well.

Genera 
 Claudius
 Staurotypus

References 

 
Taxa named by John Edward Gray